List of Milwaukee Mustangs seasons may refer to:

 List of Milwaukee Mustangs (1994–2001) seasons
 List of Milwaukee Mustangs (2009–12) seasons